Ishbara Khagan (Old Turkic: 𐰃𐱁𐰉𐰺𐰀𐰴𐰍𐰣, Ïšbara qaγan, personal name Ashina Helu  - ) (ruled 651–658) was the last khagan of the Western Turkic Khaganate.

Name 
The khagan's underlying Turkic name, transcribed with Chinese characters 賀魯, became a debate among scholars. Gumilyov proposed Hallïğ, meaning "Elevated". Von Gabain proposed name Kullïğ (slave owner). Gömeç argued for Uluğ meaning "Great",. Meanwhile, Kapusuzoğlu proposed Kutluğ (Blessed) as his underlying Turkic name. Zuev (1960) linked the Khagan personal name Helu (< MC *ɣa-lou) with the tribal name Khallukh attested by Persian and Arab writers, and asserted that by the 7th century Helu's tribe was dynastic; later, however, Zuev (2002) proposed that Chinese Helu reflects Turkic *aru ~ arïğ "pure, light".

Early years 
His parentage is uncertain. According to Gumilov his father was Böri Shad, however Chavannes attributes him to be a son of Irbis Seguy. He was awarded with the title shad by Dulu khagan in 633 and appointed to govern certain tribes including Chuye, Qarluq, Nushibi. In 646 he rose against Irbis Seguy only to be defeated by him. He fled to China in 25 April 648 and had served the Tang dynasty as a general stationed in Mohe (莫賀) city in Gansu.

However he soon started to plan to assert independence using Taizong's death in 649. Qiao Baoming (橋寶明) personal staff of Gaozong tried to avert it by ordering him to deliver his son Ashina Xiyun (阿史那咥運) to serve in palace guard. Xiyun served for a while before returning to Helu again and encouraging him to attack Irbis Dulu khagan.

Reign 
After a while he set up his horde near modern Shuanghe, began to receive submissions. According to Tongjian firstly Duolu tribe chiefs who were titled as čor, namely Chomuqun chief Kuli (處木昆(屈)律啜), Ulugh Oq chief Kul (胡祿居闕啜), Chapshata chief Ton (摄舍提暾啜), Turgesh-Halach chief (突騎施賀邏施啜), Shungish chief Chuban (鼠尼施處半啜) submitted. Ulugh Oq chief was also a son-in-law to Helu. Nushibi tribal chiefs who were titled irkin also submitted - Esegel chief Kül (阿悉結闕俟斤), Geshu chief Kül (哥舒闕俟斤), Basaigan chief Tong Ishbara (拔塞幹暾沙鉢俟斤), Esegel chief Nishu (阿悉結泥孰俟斤), Geshu chief Chuban (哥舒處半俟斤). Ashina Xiyun was appointed crown prince with the title Bagatur Yabgu.

After formally reasserting independence from Tang, he commanded raids to Jin Ling (金嶺城, near modern Shanshan, Xinjiang) and Pulei (蒲類縣). Angered Gaozong stripped him of Chinese titles and ordered Qibi Heli and Liang Jianfang (梁建方) to secure border areas.

Conflicts also began in southern border when Zhenzhu yabgu (son of Yukuk Shad) started major incursions to Western Tujue territory. Later Zhenzhu contacted Tang to receive soldiers and requested to be created a qaghan in 655. Yuan Lichen (元礼臣) was ordered by Gaozong to visit Zhenzhu in 8 November  656 to create him khagan, but he was stopped by Helu's soldiers near Suyab, causing Zhenzhu to lose much prestige.

In 657 Emperor Gaozong of Tang started the Conquest of the Western Turks. General Su Dingfang was appointed to be leading commander during whole operation. Chumukun tribe was first to lose whose chief Lantulu (懶獨祿) submitted. Tang army defeated Ishbara at the Battle of Irtysh River. However he fled to Chach with his son Ashina Xiyun and a noble retainer Xuyan. However he was soon handed over to Xiao Siya (萧嗣业) by Chach ruler Yixian Tarkhan.

Later years 
After being captured he reportedly told Xiao Siya:

Emperor Gaozong spared him after 15 days and he lived out his days at the Tang capital Chang'an. He was buried near Illig Qaghan's memorial.

See also
Tang campaigns against the Western Turks

References

Sources

Christoph Baumer, History of Central Asia, volume two, 2014, index

Göktürk khagans
658 deaths
Year of birth unknown
Place of birth unknown
Date of death unknown
7th-century Turkic people
Ashina house of the Turkic Empire